Julian Łukaszewicz (16 July 1904 – 3 August 1982) was a Polish athlete. He competed in the men's 3000 metres team race event at the 1924 Summer Olympics.

References

External links
 

1904 births
1982 deaths
Athletes (track and field) at the 1924 Summer Olympics
Polish male middle-distance runners
Olympic athletes of Poland
Sportspeople from Dnipro
People from Yekaterinoslav Governorate
People from the Russian Empire of Polish descent